Astrothelium dimidioinspersum is a species of corticolous (bark-dwelling) lichen in the family Trypetheliaceae. Found in Brazil, it was formally described as a new species in 2017 by Marcela Eugenia da Silva Cáceres and André Aptroot. The type specimen was collected by the authors along a trail near a field station in the Adolfo Ducke Forest Reserve (Manaus); here it was found growing on tree bark in old-growth rainforest. It has a dull, pale greenish thallus lacking a prothallus, and spherical to pear-shaped ascomata immersed in and on the thallus. Ascospores number two per ascus, are muriform (divided into regular chambers), and measure 155–170 by 30–40 μm. The species epithet refers to the characteristic inspersion that occurs in the upper half of the hamathecium. The lichen lacks any secondary chemicals detectable with thin-layer chromatography.

References

dimidioinspersum
Lichen species
Lichens described in 2017
Lichens of North Brazil
Taxa named by André Aptroot
Taxa named by Marcela Cáceres